The 2022 Toronto municipal election was held on October 24, 2022, to elect the mayor and 25 city councillors in Toronto, Ontario, Canada. The election was held in conjunction with those held in other municipalities in the province of Ontario.

Candidate registration opened on May 2, 2022. The deadline for nominations was August 19, 2022, at 2 p.m.

Mayoral election 

31 candidates ran to be Mayor of Toronto including incumbent John Tory, seeking a third term, and facing prominent urbanist Gil Peñalosa.

Council elections

Incumbents not running for re-election and/or who resigned prior to the election 

 Ana Bailão, councillor for Ward 9 Davenport, announced that she will not run again.
 Joe Cressy, councillor for Ward 10 Spadina—Fort York and its predecessor since 2014, resigned to become a vice-president of George Brown College. Joe Mihevc was appointed to fill the vacancy created by Cressy's resignation and has pledged to serve only for the remainder of Cressy's term and not be a candidate in the election.
 John Filion, councillor for Ward 18 Willowdale, is retiring after 40 years in municipal politics, first as a  school trustee, then as a North York city councillor and as Toronto city councillor since amalgamation in 1998.
 Michael Ford, councillor for Ward 1 Etobicoke North, vacated his seat as a result of his election to the Legislative Assembly of Ontario in the June 2, 2022 Ontario general election. Rosemarie Bryan, a Salvation Army family counsellor, was appointed to fill the seat on June 25, on Ford's recommendation, but resigned the same day after it became known that she had shared anti-LGBTQ content on social media. Rose Milczyn was appointed in August to serve the remainder of Ford's term.
 Mike Layton, councillor for Ward 11 University—Rosedale, announced in July 2022 that he will not run for another term.
 Denzil Minnan-Wong, councillor for Ward 16 Don Valley East, announced that he will not run again.
 Kristyn Wong-Tam, councillor for Ward 13 Toronto Centre and its predecessor since 2010, resigned to run for the Ontario NDP in the 2022 Ontario general election. Robin Buxton Potts was appointed by council to fill the vacancy created by Wong-Tam's resignation and pledged to act as a caretaker councillor and not run in the election.

Ward 1 Etobicoke North 

Incumbent city councillor Michael Ford was elected in 2018 with 42.26% of the vote. He was the candidate for the Progressive Conservative Party of Ontario in the 2022 Ontario general election in the York South—Weston riding and was elected to the Ontario legislature on June 2, 2022. Rose Milczyn was appointed by council to serve the remainder of Ford's term and is not running in the election.

Registered candidates

Abraham Abbey
Bill Britton
Subhash Chand
 Vincent Crisanti, former city councillor for Ward 1 Etobicoke North (2010-2018)
Michelle Garcia
 John Genser
 Avtar Minhas
 Dev Narang
 Christopher Noor
 Charles Ozzoude, endorsed by Progress Toronto and the Toronto & York Region Labour Council.
Donald Pell
 Kristian Santos
Mohit Sharma
Keith Stephen

Results

Ward 2 Etobicoke Centre 

Incumbent city councillor Stephen Holyday was elected in 2018 with 38.58% of the vote. He has registered to run for re-election.

Registered candidates
Catherine Habus
Maryam Hashimi
 Stephen Holyday, incumbent city councillor
Sam Raufi
Thomas Yanuziello

Results

Ward 3 Etobicoke—Lakeshore 

Incumbent city councillor Mark Grimes was elected in 2018 with 40.90% of the vote. He has registered to run for re-election.

Registered candidates
 Zeynel Ari, a Turkish pizza-maker who achieved fame for giving out free pizza to homeless residents of Toronto.
 Mark Grimes, incumbent city councillor. Endorsed by John Tory.
Bonnie Hu
Mary Markovic
 Amber Morley, a community health promoter who ran against Grimes in the 2018 election and placed second. Endorsed by Progress Toronto and the Toronto & York Region Labour Council.
Marco Valle is a Sergeant in the Canadian Armed Forces. He has been a member of the CAF for over 18 years. He works and lives in Ward 3 where he is raising a young family.

Results

Ward 4 Parkdale—High Park 

Incumbent city councillor Gord Perks was elected in 2018 with 44.55% of the vote. He has registered to run for re-election.

Registered candidates
 Siri Agrell, a former journalist who served as John Tory's director of strategic initiatives during his first term and was a senior political adviser to Kathleen Wynne
 Andrew Gorham
Christopher Jurik
 Chemi Lhamo
 Gord Perks, incumbent city councillor, endorsed by the Toronto & York Region Labour Council.
Steve Yuen

Results

Ward 5 York South—Weston 

Incumbent city councillor Frances Nunziata was elected in 2018 with 32.18% of the vote. She has registered to run for re-election.

Registered candidates
 Frances Nunziata, incumbent city councillor. Endorsed by John Tory.
 Chiara Padovani, an advocate for housing rights, housing advocate, and founding member of York South-Weston (YSW) Tenants. Padovani ran for election in York South-Weston in 2018 and placed third. Endorsed by Progress Toronto and the Toronto & York Region Labour Council.
 Gabriel Takang

Results

Ward 6 York Centre 

Incumbent city councillor James Pasternak was elected in 2018 with 47.61% of the vote.  He has registered to run for re-election.

Registered candidates
 Mike Arkin
Basil Canning
 James Pasternak, incumbent city councillor. Endorsed by John Tory.
 Hope Schrier

Results

Ward 7 Humber River—Black Creek 

Incumbent city councillor Anthony Perruzza was elected in 2018 with 36.80% of the vote.  He has registered to run for re-election.

Registered candidates
 Amanda Coombs
 Christopher Mammoliti, Toronto District School Board Vice-Chair and Trustee for Ward 4, Humber River - Black Creek and son of former city councillor Giorgio Mammoliti
 Anthony Perruzza, incumbent city councillor, endorsed by the Toronto & York Region Labour Council.

Results

Ward 8 Eglinton—Lawrence 

Incumbent city councillor Mike Colle was elected in 2018 with 41.34% of the vote. He has registered to run for re-election.

Registered candidates
 Mike Colle, incumbent city councillor
Philip Davidovits
Domenico Maiolo
 Evan Sambasivam,
Wendy Weston

Results

Ward 9 Davenport 

Incumbent city councillor Ana Bailão was elected in 2018 with 83.62% of the vote. She is not running for re-election.

Registered candidates
 Alejandra Bravo, candidate for the New Democratic Party in Davenport for the 2021 Canadian federal election. Endorsed by Progress Toronto and the Toronto & York Region Labour Council.
Simon Fogel
 Grant Gonzales, former President of the Davenport-Perth Neighbourhood and Community Health Centre. Co-Chair, Pride Toronto. Endorsed by John Tory.
Mosea Houghron
 Shaker Jamal, a union representative for the United Steelworkers, co-organizer of BetterTO, a salon that ran quarterly events from 2017-2018 dedicated to discussing topical city issues, including housing, policing, and childcare.
 Steven Leca
Jacob Maydansky
Lazare Shorter
 Allie Spencer

Results

Ward 10 Spadina—Fort York 
Joe Mihevc was appointed by city council on June 1, 2022 to fill the remainder of Joe Cressy's term. Cressy had been elected in 2018 with 55.06% of the vote. Cressy announced that he would not be seeking re-election and  resigned effective April 30, 2022 to accept a position as vice-president of George Brown College. Mihevc pledged to act as a caretaker councillor and not run in the election.

Registered candidates

 Rocco Achampong, a lawyer who previously ran in the 2018 municipal elections, but withdrew to focus his efforts on a court case challenging the legality of the 2018 council cut.
 Rob Cooke
 April Engelberg, a lawyer who came in second place to Joe Cressy in 2018. 
Kyle Enslen
 Peter George
 Ausma Malik, the Director of Advocacy and Organizing at the Atkinson Foundation and former Toronto District School Board Trustee for Ward 10 (Trinity-Spadina) from 2014-2018. Cressy has endorsed Malik as a candidate. Endorsed by Progress Toronto and the Toronto & York Region Labour Council.
 Karlene Nation, former reporter with CTV News Toronto
Laura-Maria Nicolareizi
 Arber Puci 
 Igor Samardzic an urban planner, person with disability. Igor was the former Chair for the Toronto Transit Commissions Accessibility Committee. 
Stephanie Soltermann
 Andrei Zodian

Results

Ward 11 University—Rosedale 

Incumbent city councillor Mike Layton was elected in 2018 with 69.56% of the vote.  He is not running for re-election.
Registered candidates
Axel Arvizu
Michael Borrelli
 Robin Buxton Potts, city councillor (appointed) for Ward 13 Toronto Centre
 Norm Di Pasquale, candidate for the New Democratic Party in Spadina—Fort York for the 2021 Canadian federal election, Toronto Catholic District School Board Trustee for Ward 9. Endorsed by Progress Toronto and the Toronto & York Region Labour Council.
David Fielder
 Adam Golding, 
 Andrew Layman  
 Peter Lovering  
Alison Pang
 Ann Rohmer, former broadcaster on CP24. Ended her campaign on August 28 due to "unforeseen family issues", but remained on the ballot.
 Dianne Saxe, former Environmental Commissioner of Ontario (2015-2019), deputy leader of the Green Party of Ontario, Green Party candidate in the 2022 Ontario general election.
Heather Shon
Pierre Therrien
 Diana Yoon, candidate for the New Democratic Party in Spadina—Fort York for the 2019 Canadian federal election. Ended her campaign on August 29 to launch a city-wide "No Developer Money" pledge campaign, but remained on the ballot.

Results

Ward 12 Toronto—St. Paul's 

Incumbent city councillor Josh Matlow was elected in 2018 with 51.60% of the vote. He has registered to run for re-election.

Registered candidates
Bryan Ashworth
 Antonio Corpuz
 Josh Matlow, incumbent city councillor
Bob Murphy

Results

Ward 13 Toronto Centre 
Robin Buxton Potts was appointed by city council on June 1, 2022 to fill the remainder of city councillor Kristyn Wong-Tam's term. Wong-Tam was elected in 2018 with 50.26% of the vote. She announced that she would not be seeking re-election and resigned effective May 4, 2022 to run in the provincial election. Buxton Potts pledged to act as a caretaker councillor and not run in the election.

Registered candidates
Miguel Avila
 Colin Johnson
 Ryan Lester, Ended his campaign on October 3 for personal reasons, and endorsed Ward.
Dan Cortez Manalo
Cleveland Marshall
 Chris Moise, Toronto District School Board Trustee for Ward 10, University - Rosedale and Toronto Centre Endorsed by Progress Toronto and the Toronto & York Region Labour Council.
 Caroline Murphy
Dev Ramsumair
 Nicki Ward, candidate for the Green Party of Ontario in Toronto Centre for the 2022 Ontario general election.

Results

Ward 14 Toronto—Danforth 

Incumbent city councillor Paula Fletcher was elected in 2018 with 42.27% of the vote. She has registered to run for re-election.
 Wali Abro
John De Marco
James Dyson
 Paula Fletcher, incumbent city councillor, endorsed by the Toronto & York Region Labour Council.
Denise Walcott

Results

Ward 15 Don Valley West 

Incumbent city councillor Jaye Robinson was elected in 2018 with 49.22% of the vote. She has registered to run for re-election.

Registered candidates
 David Ricci, endorsed by the Toronto & York Region Labour Council. 
 Jaye Robinson, incumbent city councillor
Sheena Sharp
 Gregory Vaz

Results

Ward 16 Don Valley East 

Incumbent city councillor Denzil Minnan-Wong was elected in 2018 with 43.33% of the vote.  He is not running for re-election.

Registered candidates
Samina Alim
 Walter Alvarez-Bardales, former Ontario Liberal Party candidate from  York—Simcoe in the 2022 Ontario general election, civil servant, disability, human rights and Healthcare advocate
George Asimakis
Jon Burnside, former councillor for Don Valley West (2014-2018). Endorsed by John Tory.
 Stella Kargiannakis
 Stephen Ksiazek, President of Don Mills Residents Inc (DMRI),  endorsed by the Toronto & York Region Labour Council.
Colin Mahovlich
Jonathan Mousley
 Nick Pachis
Dmitre Popov
John Simms

Results

Ward 17 Don Valley North 

Incumbent city councillor Shelley Carroll was elected in 2018 with 40.44% of the vote. She has registered to run for re-election.

Registered candidates
 Shelley Carroll, incumbent city councillor, endorsed by the Toronto & York Region Labour Council.
Daryl Christoff
Sandakie Ekanayake
Justin Knott
Angela Lindow
Calvin Xu

Results

Ward 18 Willowdale 

Incumbent city councillor John Filion was elected in 2018 with 31.06% of the vote. He has represented Willowdale on North York and then Toronto city council since the 1990 municipal election. He is not running for re-election.

Registered candidates
 Lily Cheng, executive director of NeighbourLink North York and founder of the "North York Moms" Facebook group. In 2018, Cheng ran against Filion and placed second.
 Daniel Lee
 Markus O'Brien Fehr, a member of Filion's city hall staff. Filion has endorsed O'Brien Fehr as a candidate in 2022. Also endorsed by John Tory.
Elham Shahban

Results

Ward 19 Beaches—East York 

Incumbent city councillor Brad Bradford was elected in 2018 with 38.56% of the vote. He has registered to run for re-election.

Registered candidates
Sébastien Auget
 Brad Bradford, incumbent city councillor. Endorsed by John Tory.
Donna Braniff
Frank Marra
Adam Smith
Steven Thompson
 Jennie Worden

Results

Ward 20 Scarborough Southwest 

Incumbent city councillor Gary Crawford was elected in 2018 with 35.73% of the vote. He has registered to run for re-election.

Registered candidates
 Malik Ahmad
 Sharif Ahmed
 Lorenzo Berardinetti, former MPP (2003-2018) and city councillor (1997-2003).
 Gary Crawford, incumbent city councillor. Endorsed by John Tory.
 Corey David
 Parthi Kandavel, the Toronto District School Board Trustee for Ward 18, Scarborough Southwest.
 Philip Mills
 Kevin Rupasinghe, graduate of the University of Toronto's Master of Engineering in Cities Engineering and Management, Co-Chair of the Ranked Ballot Initiative of Toronto (RaBiT), board member of Unlock Democracy Canada, an electoral reform advocacy group, and former Cycle Toronto Senior Advocacy Manager Endorsed by Progress Toronto.

Results

Ward 21 Scarborough Centre 

Incumbent city councillor Michael Thompson was elected in 2018 with 69.05% of the vote. He has registered to run for re-election.

 Registered candidates
 Muhammad Ayub
 Paul Beatty
 Hansie Daniel
 Luigi Lisciandro
 Michael Thompson, incumbent city councillor
 Kiri Vadivelu

Results

Ward 22 Scarborough—Agincourt 

Incumbent city councillor Nick Mantas was elected in 2021 in a by-election when Jim Karygiannis, who was removed from city council, with 26.98% of the vote. He has registered to run for re-election.

Registered candidates
 Anthony Internicola, a former People's Party of Canada candidate for the Scarborough—Agincourt riding in the 2019 Canadian federal election.
 Serge Khatchasourian
Ronald Lin
 Antonios Mantas
 Nick Mantas, incumbent city councillor. Endorsed by John Tory.
 Bill Wu

Results

Ward 23 Scarborough North 

Incumbent city councillor Cynthia Lai was elected in 2018 with 27.02% of the vote. She was running for re-election but unexpectedly died on October 21, just three days before the vote.

Registered candidates
 Phillip Francis
Virginia Jones
 Cynthia Lai, incumbent city councillor. Endorsed by John Tory. Died on October 21, but remained on the ballot; any votes cast for Lai were not counted.
 Jamaal Myers, a lawyer working for TD Bank, a transit advocate and member of Scarborough Transit Action, and member of the Scarborough Business Association Endorsed by Progress Toronto and the Toronto & York Region Labour Council.

Results

Ward 24 Scarborough—Guildwood 

Incumbent city councillor Paul Ainslie was elected in 2018 with 66.82% of the vote. He has registered to run for re-election.

Registered candidates
 Paul Ainslie, incumbent city councillor
Habiba Desai
Vivian Parker
Keiosha Ross

Results

Ward 25 Scarborough—Rouge Park 

Incumbent city councillor Jennifer McKelvie was elected in 2018 with 40.21% of the vote. She has registered to run for re-election.

Registered candidates
 Ashan Fernando
Jacinta Kanakaratnam
 Jennifer McKelvie, incumbent city councillor

Results

Candidate endorsements
Incumbent mayor John Tory, the Toronto & York Region Labour Council, and advocacy groups More Neighbours Toronto and Progress Toronto have all made endorsements across multiple wards.

John Tory
Mark Grimes, Ward 3 Etobicoke-Lakeshore
Siri Agrell, Ward 4 Parkdale-High Park
Frances Nunziata, Ward 5 York—South-Weston
James Pasternak, Ward 6 York Centre
Mike Colle, Ward 8 Eglinton-Lawrence
Grant Gonzales, Ward 9, Davenport
Jon Burnside, Ward 16, Don Valley East
Markus O’Brien Fehr, Ward 18, Willowdale
Brad Bradford, Ward 19, Beaches—East York
Gary Crawford, Ward 20, Scarborough Southwest
Nick Mantas, Ward 22, Scarborough Agincourt
Cynthia Lai, Ward 23, Scarborough North

More Neighbours Toronto
Thomas Yanuziello, Ward 2, Etobicoke Centre
Amber Morley, Ward 3, Etobicoke-Lakeshore
Evan Sambasivam, Ward 8, Eglinton–Lawrence
Grant Gonzales, Ward 9, Davenport
Igor Samardzic, Ward 10, Spadina—Fort York (with secondary endorsement of Ausma Malik)
Chris Moise, Ward 13, Toronto Centre
Sheena Sharp, Ward 15, Don Valley West	(with secondary endorsement of David Ricci)
Colin Mahovlich, Ward 16, Don Valley East
Brad Bradford, Ward 19, Beaches—East York
Kevin Rupasinghe, Ward 20, Scarborough Southwest
Jamaal Myers, Ward 23, Scarborough North

Progress Toronto
Charles Ozzoude, Ward 1, Etobicoke North
Amber Morley, Ward 3, Etobicoke-Lakeshore
Chiara Padovani, Ward 5, York—South Weston
Alejandra Bravo, Ward 9, Davenport
Ausma Malik, Ward 10, Spadina—Fort York
Norm Di Pasquale, Ward 11, University-Rosedale
Chris Moise, Ward 13, Toronto Centre
Kevin Rupasinghe, Ward 20, Scarborough Southwest
Jamaal Myers, Ward 23, Scarborough North

Toronto & York Region Labour Council
Charles Ozzoude, Ward 1, Etobicoke North
Amber Morley, Ward 3, Etobicoke-Lakeshore
Gord Perks, Ward 4, Parkdale—High Park
Chiara Padovani, Ward 5, York—South Weston
Anthony Perruzza, Ward 7, Humber River—Black Creek	
Alejandra Bravo, Ward 9, Davenport
Ausma Malik, Ward 10, Spadina—Fort York
Norm Di Pasquale, Ward 11, University-Rosedale
Chris Moise, Ward 13, Toronto Centre
Paula Fletcher, Ward 14, Toronto Danforth 
David Ricci, Ward 15, Don Valley West	
Stephen Ksiazek, Ward 16, Don Valley East
Shelley Carroll, Ward 17, Don Valley North
Jamaal Myers, Ward 23, Scarborough North

Toronto Community Bikeways Coalition
Thomas Yanuziello, Ward 2, Etobicoke Centre
Amber Morley, Ward 3, Etobicoke-Lakeshore
Chiara Padovani, Ward 5, York—South Weston
Alejandra Bravo, Ward 9, Davenport
Markus O'Brien Fehr, Ward 18, Willowdale
Kevin Rupasinghe, Ward 20, Scarborough Southwest
Jamaal Myers, Ward 23, Scarborough North
Gil Penalosa, Mayor

Toronto Star
Charles Ozzoude, Ward 1, Etobicoke North
Amber Morley, Ward 3, Etobicoke-Lakeshore
Gord Perks, Ward 4, Parkdale-High Park
Chiara Padovani, Ward 5, York South-Weston
James Pasternak, Ward 6, York Centre
Anthony Perruzza, Ward 7, Humber River-Black Creek
Mike Colle, Ward 8, Eglinton-Lawrence
Alejandra Bravo, Ward 9, Davenport
Ausma Malik, Ward 10, Spadina-Fort York
Robin Buxton Potts, Ward 11, University-Rosedale
Josh Matlow, Ward 12, Toronto-St. Paul’s
Chris Moise, Ward 13, Toronto Centre
Paula Fletcher, Ward 14, Toronto-Danforth
Jaye Robinson, Ward 15, Don Valley West
Jon Burnside or Stephen Ksiazek, Ward 16, Don Valley East
Shelley Carroll, Ward 17, Don Valley North
Markus O’Brien Fehr, Ward 18, Willowdale
Brad Bradford, Ward 19, Beaches-East York
Kevin Rupasinghe, Ward 20, Scarborough Southwest
Nick Mantas, Ward 22, Scarborough-Agincourt
Jamaal Myers, Ward 23, Scarborough North
Paul Ainslie, Ward 24, Scarborough-Guildwood
Jennifer McKelvie, Ward 25, Scarborough-Rouge Park
 John Tory, Mayor

Footnotes

References

External links 

 City of Toronto - Elections

Municipal elections in Toronto
Toronto
2022 in Toronto